Elvis and Slick Monty is a television series which aired on NTTV from 2004 to 2006.

Synopsis
The adventures of two roommates (a half-man/half-fly referee and an ex-musician loosely based on Elvis Presley) as they face off against the world domination plans of an evil mayor.

Cast
 Erik Klein as Elvis (Season 1)
 Banks Lee as Elvis (Season 2)
 Greg Janda as Slick Monty
 Branden Finney as Doctor Leon
 Jeff Stebbins as Silvan Summers
 Mariola Schmid as Diane Buttercup
 Mark Moseley as Joey Bagwell
 Matthew Muhl as Various Characters

Episodes

Season One
 Episode 101 - "Kamikaze Pilot"
 Episode 102 - "The Big Sexy Sex Episode of Sex"
 Episode 103 - "A Fish Called Bananers"
 Episode 104 - "Elvis' Song"
 Episode 105 - "Wooo's the Boss"

Season Two
 Episode 201 - "Guess Who's Coming to Dinner (Honkey Edition)"
 Episode 202 - "All Shaked Up"
 Episode 203 - "In Goldblum"
 Episode 204 - "The Puppet Masters"
 Episode 205 - "Shades of Gray"

Awards
In 2007, Elvis and Slick Monty won a Lone Star Emmy award for "Outstanding Student Production (Non-News)".

DVD release
Two 3-disc DVD sets include the complete first and second seasons (along with audio commentary, bloopers, advertisements and the retrospective documentary "Behind the Shades: The Making of Elvis and Slick Monty"). The DVD is currently available through the show's official website.

References

2004 American television series debuts
2006 American television series endings